Sakuntala, also Sakontala,  701, is an unfinished opera in three acts, written c. 1820 by Franz Schubert to a libretto by Johann Philipp Neumann. The opera is based on the Sanskrit story of Shakuntala's love for King Duschmanta and her rejection.

Composition
The work is for fourteen sopranos, three altos, five tenors, nine basses, mixed choir and orchestra.
 Akt I
 1. Introduktion: Das holde Licht des Tages (sketch)
 2. Arie: Du hoffest im Arme des Gatten (sketch)
 3. Quintett: Hier liegen wir im Staub gebeuget (sketch)
 4. Arie: Wie fühl’ ich, ihr Götter (sketch)
 5. Chor der Waldnymphen: Wo du wandelst (sketch)
 6. Arie: Noch schläft die goldne Sonne (sketch)
 7. Finale I: Sieg deinen Fahnen, König (sketch)
 Akt II
 8a. Terzett: Komm nur Dieb (sketch)
 8b. Terzett: So liebes Brüderchen (sketch)
 9. Quartett: Rosenzeit der Freuden (sketch) 
 10. Septett: Mit liebendem Verlangen (sketch)
 11. Arie: Trauet auf Götter (sketch)

Recordings
 completed by Karl Aage Rasmussen, Frieder Bernius 2CD Carus 2008

References

1820 operas
German-language operas
Operas by Franz Schubert
Operas
Works based on Shakuntala (play)